Amata kruegeri, or Ragusa's nine-spotted moth, is a moth of the family Erebidae. The species was first described by Emile Enrico Ragusa in 1904. It is found in southern and eastern Europe.

The larvae feed on various low-growing plants, including Plantago, Rumex, Galium and Taraxacum species.

Subspecies
Amata kruegeri kruegeri (Sicily, Italy)
Amata kruegeri albionica Dufay, 1965 (southern France)
Amata kruegeri marjana (Stauder, 1913) (former Yugoslavia)
Amata kruegeri odessana Obraztsov, 1935 (southern Ukraine)
Amata kruegeri pedemontii (Rocci, 1941)
Amata kruegeri quercii (Verity, 1914)
Amata kruegeri sheljuzhkoi (Obraztsov, 1966) (Daghestan)

References

External links

Lepiforum e.V.

kruegeri
Moths of Europe
Moths described in 1904